The following is a chronology of indoor American football video games. There have been five games released on the subject of indoor American football. The first game was Arena Football in 1988, which was re-designed and released in 1992 under the same name. Arena Football '95 was an unreleased game for the Atari Jaguar, but the prototype has since surfaced and it was subsequently released on the Jaguar by homebrew publishers. The most recent indoor American football game is Arena Football: Road to Glory, which was released on February 21, 2007. It was a sequel to the 2006 EA Sports title Arena Football.

To date, although several indoor American football leagues have come and gone, the only one to have lent a license to a video game product has been the Arena Football League.

Chronology

See also
Chronology of baseball video games
List of American football video games

References

Arena football video games
Video games